The 44th Aviation Division (Serbo-Croatian: 44. vazduhoplovna divizija/ 44.  ваздухопловна дивизија) was a unit originally established in 1945 as the 3rd  Aviation Fighter Division (Serbo-Croatian: 3. vazduhoplovna lovačka divizija / 3. ваздухопловна ловачка дивизија).

History

3rd Fighter Aviation Division
The 3rd Fighter Aviation Division was established by order from August 3, 1945, with headquarters at Mostar. The division was direct under the Command of Yugoslav Air Force. It consisted from 254th Fighter and 112th Fighter Aviation Regiment.

Because of the crisis at Northwest of county, division has been dislocated to Novi Sad by Spring of 1946, and to Ljubljana by Summer-Autumn same year. On 9 August 1946 a pair of Yak-3 aircraft from 254th Regiment piloted by the Lieutenant Dragan Zečević and Warrant Officer Dragan Stanisavljević have open fire and hit USAF C-47 which has violated Yugoslav airspace flow over Ljubljana airport at 12 p.m. which has forced landing 12 km near Kranj. One passenger, Turkish captain was wounded by hit, while crew and passengers were captured by Yugoslav Army. Later it was released by August 22, and the tension made with this incident and another one shooting down of USAF C-47 with fatal consequences for whole crew of five airmen was reduced after Marshal Tito ordered to pay $150.000 to families of killed US airmen. By winter, division with its regiments has moved to Mostar and than again in 1947 across Novi Sad to Ljubljana and Cerklje where it stayed during late 1947 and 1948.

By the 1948 year this division was renamed like all other units of Yugoslav Army, so it has become  44th Fighter Aviation Division (Serbo-Croatian: 44. vazduhoplovna lovačka divizija/ 44. ваздухопловна ловачка дивизија).

The commanders of division in this period were Petar Radević and Hinko Šoić. Commissars were Milutin Omazić and Svetozar Radojević.

44th Aviation Division

The 44th Fighter Aviation Division was formed by renaming of 3rd Fighter Aviation Division in 1948. It suffered a changes in the organization. Division has moved from Cerklje in 1949 to Zemun and finally to new build Batajnica Air Base in 1951 where it has stayed until it was disbanded.

In 1953 division was attached to 7th Aviation Corps. It has relocated its headquarters from Zagreb to Cerklje. By 1953 it was renamed in to Aviation Fighter-Bomber Division due to the replacement of Soviet fighter aircraft with US-made fighter-bombers.

It was disbanded by the order from June 27, 1959, year per the "Drvar" reorganization plan.  It was transformed into 1st Air Command.

The commanders of division in this period were Hinko Šoić, Mihajlo Nikolić and Nikola Lekić. Commissars were Svetozar Radojević and Alojz Tencer until 1953.

Assignments
Command of Yugoslav Air Force (1945-1953)
7th Aviation Corps (1949–1959)

Previous designations
3rd Aviation Fighter Division (1945-1948)
44th Aviation Fighter Division (1948-1953)
44th Aviation Fighter-Bomber Division (1953-1959)

Organization

1945-1948
3rd Aviation Mixed Division
254th Fighter Aviation Regiment
112th Fighter Aviation Regiment

1948-1959
44th Aviation Fighter/Fighter-Bomber Division
Training Squadron of 44th Aviation Division (1953-1954, 1956–1959)
103rd Reconnaissance Aviation Regiment (1952-1953)
117th Fighter Aviation Regiment
172nd Assault Aviation Regiment (1949)
204th Fighter Aviation Regiment (1950-1959)
177th Air Base (1953-1959)
191st Air Base (1953-1959)
399th Air Base (1953-1956)

Headquarters
Mostar  (1945-1946)
Novi Sad (1946)
Ljubljana (1946)
Mostar  (1946-1947)
Ljubljana (1947)
Cerklje (1947-1949)
Zemun (1949-1951)
Batajnica (1951-1959)

Commanding officers 

Lieutenant-Colonel Petar Radević 
Lieutenant-Colonel Hinko Šoić
Colonel Mihajlo Nikolić	
Colonel Nikola Lekić

Political commissars
Lieutenant-Colonel Milutin Omazić 
Lieutenant-Colonel Svetozar Radojević
Colonel Alojz Tencer

References 
Notes and citations

Bibliography
 

Divisions of Yugoslav Air Force
Military units and formations established in 1945
Military units and formations disestablished in 1959